Abraham Lincoln High School, usually referred to simply as Lincoln High School or Lincoln, is a public secondary school located on Des Moines Southside Des Moines, Iowa, United States.  It is one of five secondary schools under the district of the Des Moines Independent Community School District, the largest high school in the Des Moines public school district and the state of Iowa. With a population of 2,409+ students operating out of two buildings on the Des Moines Southside was named after the 16th United States president Abraham Lincoln. The school sports team is named after one of President Lincoln's nicknames, the "Rail Splitter" (the "Lincoln Railsplitters" or "Rails"). Their mascot is typically a senior at the school or a recent alumni dressed up as Abraham Lincoln. The school is known as the Pride of the South Side.

History
Lincoln High School was constructed to address the increasing enrollment of students at nearby East High School. During this time, the south side of Des Moines was home to new urban development. This further increased enrollment and the need for an additional school. A bond issue was passed on March 18, 1918, that provided the funds to build the school. By 1923, construction was completed, at a cost of $949,754.95 USD.

At that time, the school had 55 classrooms, a swimming pool, two gymnasiums, several labs, an art and music room, a cafeteria, and an auditorium, providing for a total student capacity of 1,300.

In 1962 an additional wing was constructed, with classrooms, laboratory areas, and a library with over 13,000 volumes.

A male faculty lounge was added in 1963. An existing light-well was enclosed to provide for this new room.

In 1964, further expansions were contracted at a total cost of $1,667,000. This provided for the construction of the Roundhouse, home to the indoor sporting venues. On the lower level, a new swimming pool and boys' locker room were constructed. The old swimming pool was converted to classroom space, but the old gymnasiums are still in use. The old locker rooms were remodeled into the girls' locker rooms.

There are a number of prized possessions at the school. In the floor of the vestibule is the school monogram done in bronze, surrounded by a design in variegated marble. On the south wall is a portrait of The Boy Lincoln, painted by Russell Cowles, a former student of West High School. On the north wall is Lincoln the Statesman, painted by William Reaser. In the main corridor is a bronze bust of Lincoln, the work of Laurence Stewart, former student of East High.

The cornerstone of the old Lincoln School, which used to be at Ninth and Mulberry Streets, has been set as a memorial on the Lincoln High lawn. It was presented to the school with appropriate ceremonies when the old school was demolished. This cornerstone is only one of the many reminders of President Lincoln that are preserved by the school. There is a steel engraving of the Lincoln family when Lincoln was in office, and one of the President himself, both presented to the school by Fred Foss. A piece of a log from Lincoln's cabin birthplace was presented by W. L. King, a former school teacher. An engraving of the national monument in the Soldiers’ National Cemetery, which was dedicated by President Lincoln with his famous Gettysburg Address, is also in the collection. In the auditorium above the stage are the words of that famous address, in gold.

Campus

Lincoln has three levels of classrooms, with the Commons and music classrooms located on the lowest level. The old "small gym" occupies the second and third levels in the main concourse (with the entrance on the second level). The Roundhouse is the primary gymnasium in use at Lincoln. The upper level holds an arena with a capacity of 2,500. The lower level of the Roundhouse holds the weight-training area, boys' locker rooms, and swimming pool. All freshman classes were held at RAILS Academy (formally known as Kurtz Junior High building) from 2005 to 2018.

On the opposite side of Bell Avenue are two student parking lots, tennis courts, a general practice field, and Hutchens Metro Stadium (home to football and track events). Hutchens Metro Stadium has a capacity of 7,500.

Fine arts
Drama – The Drama Department has won awards, especially in the area of IHSSA. It presents two full-length performances each year.

Music – Musical groups at Lincoln include Concert Band, Marching Band, Jazz Band I, Jazz Band II, Pep Band, Orchestra, Chamber Choir, Treble Choir, Concert Choir, RAILS Ninth Grade Choirs, Infinity Varsity Show Choir, Omega JV Show Choir, and  Jazz Choir. The Lincoln Vocal Music Department is led by Director Christian White, assisted by Director Paige Harpin. The Lincoln High School Fight Song is based on the fight song of the College of Washington and Lee, in Virginia.

Journalism – The official school newspaper is The Railsplitter. It has received merit recognition from the National Scholastic Press Association, Columbia School of Journalism, the highest recognition given to a high school publication. There is also an independent newspaper, The Random Independent, created by freshmen at Lincoln South.

Visual arts – Art classes include Painting/Drawing/Multi-Media, 3D design, and AP Studio Art. Each year the art department competes in exhibitions and art shows. The art club is called the Dorian Art Club.

Athletics

Lincoln is a member of the Central Iowa Metro League (CIML), which consists of 19 schools across central Iowa and is divided into four division. Lincoln competes in the CIML Metro division. The division includes six teams: the five Des Moines schools (East, Hoover, Lincoln, North, and Roosevelt), and Ottumwa.

Lincoln High School has 19 sports – ten for boys and nine for girls – and there are ample opportunities for students to get involved, either as a participant or a team manager.

Students
As of the 2005–06 school year, there were 2,126 students enrolled at Lincoln, which makes the school the largest in Iowa, ahead of  West High School in Davenport. 76.9% of the student body is of White (European-American) descent (down from 79.3% in the 2004–05 school year). The leading ethnic group by enrollment is that of Latino descent, and they are followed by Black (African-American), Asian, and Indian (Native American or Alaskan Native). This makes the school the least diverse of the other high schools in the Des Moines Public School district.

Faculty
There are approximately 107 instructors at Lincoln High, which puts the student-teacher ratio at about 20 students per course instructor.  76 additional personnel carry out other administrative duties. In total, the faculty count is approximately 183.

Extracurricular activities
Student extracurricular activities include:

 Clubs (as of 2005–06 school year; clubs in italics are defunct)
 Drama Club
 International Thespian Society Troupe #4752
 National Honor Society
 Rails Key Club
 Anime Club
 Business Professionals of America
 Computer Club
 Straight and Gay Alliance (SAGA)
 Students Against Drunk Drivers (SADD)
 DECA
 Dorian Art Club
 Gamer's Paradise
 Activities
 Student Council
 Debate/Forensics
 Mock Trial
 Academic Decathlon
 Academic Letter
 Ambassadors
 Band (Marching, Jazz, Concert, Pep)
 Cheerleading
 Close Up
 Committee Select
 Conflict Management
 Fellowship of Christian Athletes
 Mermaids Synchronized Swimming
 Minority Achievement Program (MAP)
 Quiz Bowl
 Railettes Dance Team
 Railmen
 Robotics FIRST Tech Challenge 11391,12233
 Science Bound
 Sisters for Success
 Upward Bound
 We the People
 Sports
 JV Show Choir
 Varsity Show Choir
 Volleyball
 Baseball
 Basketball
 Bowling
 Cross Country
 Football
 Golf
 Rugby
 Softball
 Swimming
 Soccer
 Tennis
 Track
 Wrestling

Curriculum
The school is on a system of "block" scheduling, which shortens the number of classes per day to four; however, each class is significantly longer than in years past.  Each student is required to take eight classes with four on each day on an alternating schedule (referred to as "A" and "B" days).   The school district requires students to take a number of core academic courses, including Social Studies, English, Mathematics, Science, Art, and Physical Education. The amount of academic credit needed to satisfy graduation requirements is determined by the school district.  Many students also attend Central Academy and Central Campus in downtown Des Moines in order to acquire college credit and technical proficiency.

All students are required by the district to enroll in four subject courses and a Physical Education course. However, the school compels lower-class students to schedule a full day of classes, in order to ensure satisfaction with district graduation requirements. Juniors and seniors have the option of having an "open period" during the first or last period of the school day. Seniors may have open periods during any period. However, juniors require parental permission to have an open period.

The district requires four years of Physical Education. Freshmen and sophomores usually take their PE courses at the school. Juniors and seniors have the option of taking alternative PE programs, including a bowling class that requires students to commute to a nearby bowling alley. In compliance with state law, students with a full academic schedule can be made exempt from all PE requirements for that year, or allowed to perform self-study PE.

Notable alumni
Trevon Young, Professional Football Player
Robert Johnson, Mr. Iowa Basketball in 1987, played at Iowa State
Jordan Bernstine, Professional Football Player
Victor Jackovich, former U.S. Ambassador to Boznia & Herzegovina
Jerry Crawford (lawyer), lawyer
Tanya Warren, Northern Iowa Women's Basketball Coach
Christopher McDonald (jurist), Iowa Supreme Court Judge
Tom Choi, Actor
Kevin McCarthy Iowa Politician
Pete Sterbick, College Football Coach
Nicholas A. Klinefeldt, U.S. Attorney
Corey Taylor, musician, frontman of Slipknot and Stone Sour (dropped out)

See also
 Des Moines Independent Community School District for other schools in the same district
 List of high schools in Iowa

References

External links

 Des Moines Public Schools Homepage
 Lincoln High School Homepage

Schools in Des Moines, Iowa
Educational institutions established in 1923
Public high schools in Iowa
School buildings on the National Register of Historic Places in Iowa
National Register of Historic Places in Des Moines, Iowa
Iowa High School Athletic Association
1923 establishments in Iowa